This list of Oberlin College and Conservatory People contains links to Wikipedia articles about notable alumni of and other people connected to Oberlin College, including the Conservatory of Music and the Graduate School of Theology.

Notable alumni

Award winners

Nobel laureates
Joshua Angrist (B.A. Economics 1982), Nobel laureate (Economic Sciences 2021), shared with David Card and Guido W. Imbens "for their methodological contributions to the analysis of causal relationships."
Stanley Cohen (M.A. zoology, 1945), Nobel (Physiology and Medicine, 1986), for "discoveries of growth factors"
Robert Millikan (B.A. 1891), Nobel laureate (Physics, 1923) "for his work on the elementary charge of electricity and on the photoelectric effect"
Roger Wolcott Sperry (B.A. English 1935, M.A. psychology 1937), neurobiologist who studied split-brain research, Nobel laureate (Medicine, 1981), "for his discoveries concerning the functional specialization of the cerebral hemispheres"

Pulitzer Prize
Carl Dennis (transferred to University of Chicago, University of Minnesota), Pulitzer Prize-winning poet of Practical Gods; Ruth Lilly Poetry Prize
Michael Dirda (BA 1970), Pulitzer Prize-winning Washington Post reviewer, author
Du Yun (BM 2001), composer, winner of the 2017 Pulitzer Prize for Music for opera Angel's Bone.
Emily Nussbaum (BA 1988), winner of the 2016 Pulitzer Prize for Criticism
Christopher Rouse (BM 1971), winner of the 1993 Pulitzer Prize for Music for Trombone Concerto
Vijay Seshadri (BA 1974), winner of the 2014 Pulitzer Prize for Poetry for 3 Sections
George Walker (1941, honorary degree 1983), composer, first African American to be awarded the Pulitzer Prize for Music (1996, for Lilacs)
Thornton Wilder (transferred to Yale), playwright and novelist; three Pulitzer Prizes—for the novel The Bridge of San Luis Rey and for two plays Our Town and The Skin of Our Teeth; U.S. National Book Award for the novel The Eighth Day
Franz Wright (BA 1977), recipient of the 2004 Pulitzer Prize for Poetry for Walking to Martha's Vineyard

French Legion of Honor
Katharine Wright (1893), Legion d'Honneur Business Owner, Financier and Sister of aviation pioneers Wilbur and Orville Wright.

Academy, Grammy, Tony, Emmy, and Golden Globe awards
 Sibbi Bernhardsson (1995), violinist, recipient of a Grammy Award with the Pacifica Quartet, 2008. Best Chamber Music Performance for Elliott Carter: String Quartets Nos. 1 And 5.
 Montana Levi Blanco (2006), costume designer, recipient of a Tony Award for The Skin of Our Teeth (2022) 
 Mark Boal (1995), screenwriter, recipient of two Academy Awards (Best Picture and Best Original Screenplay for The Hurt Locker, 2009)
 James Burrows (1962), producer and creator of Cheers and Emmy award-winning director of Will & Grace, Wings, News Radio 
 Francois S. Clemmons (1976), sang the role of Sportin' Life in Gershwin's Porgy & Bess, recipient of a company Grammy Award Best Opera Recording
 Marc Cohn (1981), singer-songwriter, recipient of a Grammy Award (1991, Best New Artist)
 Lena Dunham (2008), recipient of the 2013 Golden Globe Awards for Best TV Series - Music or Comedy, and Best Actress in a TV Series, the HBO series Girls
Chris Eldridge (2004), guitarist in Punch Brothers, formerly in the Infamous Stringdusters 
 Rhiannon Giddens (2000), member of the Carolina Chocolate Drops; Grammy winner (2010, Grammy Award for Best Traditional Folk Album)
 William Goldman (1952), novelist (The Princess Bride) and recipient of Academy Awards for the screenplays of Butch Cassidy and the Sundance Kid (1969) and All the President's Men (1976)
 Charles Harbutt (1983), classical recording engineer, Grammy recipient (2000 and 2003)
 Bill Irwin (1973), actor and clown, 1984 MacArthur Fellow, recipient of a Tony Award for Who's Afraid of Virginia Woolf? (2005)
 Natasha Katz (1981), lighting designer, recipient of four Tony Awards for The Glass Menagerie (2014), Once (2012), The Coast of Utopia (2007), and Aida (2000)
 Alex Klein (1987), oboist, recipient of a Grammy Award (2002, Best Solo Instrumentalist with Orchestra)
 John McClure, record producer, received four Grammy Awards for Stravinsky Conducts Columbia Symphony Orchestra – Le Sacre Du Printemps (1962),  Leonard Bernstein, New York Philharmonic – Symphony No. 3 Kaddish (1965), Mahler, Symphony of a Thousand (1968), and Bernstein's West Side Story with Te Kanawa, Carreras, Troyanos, Ollmann, Horne (1986).
 Michael Maguire (1977), (1987) recipient of Tony Awards for Les Misérables, A Little Night Music (New York City Opera), Kismet (Royal Canadian Opera), Annie Get Your Gun (Miami Opera), currently prominent Beverly Hills divorce attorney; voted Super Lawyer/Rising Star (2011–13)
 Gregory Mosher (1971), director, recipient of Tony Award for revivals of Anything Goes (1984) and Our Town (1989)
Christopher Rouse (BM 1971), Grammy Award for Best Classical Contemporary Composition for Concert de Gaudí (2002)
 Jeannette Sorrell (1990), founder and artistic director of the Apollo's Fire Baroque Orchestra; Grammy winner Songs of Orpheus (2018)
 Julie Taymor (1974), director, filmmaker, screenwriter, recipient of Emmy and Tony awards (Frida, Titus, Broadway's The Lion King, Across the Universe)

MacArthur Fellows
The following alumni are fellows of the MacArthur Fellows Program from the John D. and Catherine T. MacArthur Foundation.  As this is an interdisciplinary award, they are listed here in addition to their listing in their field of accomplishment.

 Jad Abumrad (1995), radio producer, known for the NPR-distributed Radiolab
 Alison Bechdel (1981), pioneering LGBT cartoonist, author of Dykes to Watch Out For and Fun Home
 Claire Chase (2001), flautist and arts entrepreneur
 Jeremy Denk (1990), pianist and writer
 Rhiannon Giddens (2000), musician, MacArthur Fellowship awarded 2017
 Ralf Hotchkiss (1969), engineer and businessman
 Bill Irwin (1973), actor
 Kiese Laymon (1998), writer
 Richard Lenski (1977), biologist
 Diane E. Meier (1973), doctor, MacArthur Fellowship awarded 2008
 Thylias Moss (1981), poet and playwright
 Julie Taymor (1974), director, MacArthur Fellowship awarded 1991
Paul Wennberg (1985), chemist

Rome prize

Courtney Bryan (2004)
Ashley Fure (2005)
Stephen Hartke (1992)
Pierre Jalbert (2000)
 Jesse Jones (2012)

Academia

 Louisa Lydia Alexander (1856), schoolteacher
 Joshua Angrist (1982), labour market economist
 Lauren Berlant (1979), feminist, queer cultural studies scholar
Helen E. Blackwell (1994), organic chemist and chemical biologist, Professor of Chemistry at the University of Wisconsin–Madison
Richard D. Brown (1961), historian of colonial and revolutionary America, now emeritus professor at the University of Connecticut
 Christopher Browning (1968), historian of the Holocaust
 Miriam Eliza Carey (1858–1937), librarian who helped put the first libraries in American institutions
 Samuel Charache, hematologist, discoverer of the first effective treatment for sickle cell disease
 Mabel Augusta Chase (1888), physicist and professor
 Dr. Francois S. Clemmons (1997–2013), Alexander Twilight Artist in Residence, now Emeritus Professor at Middlebury College
 Johnnetta B. Cole (1957), first female African-American president of Spelman College, president of Bennett College 2002–07
 John R. Commons (1888), institutional economist and labor historian
 Carol Blanche Cotton (1904), African-American psychologist who worked on spastic paralysis in children
 Ethel McGhee Davis (1923), educator, social worker, and college administrator
 Walter B. Denny (1964), art historian
 Jon Michael Dunn, philosopher (logician)
 John Millott Ellis (1851), acting President of Oberlin College and abolitionist
 George Fairchild (1862), third President of Kansas State University
 Peter Tyrrell Flawn (1947), geologist and former President of the University of Texas at Austin
 Jeffrey I. Gordon (1969), biologist and Professor
 Daniel McBride Graham (1843), inventor, Free Will Baptist pastor, first president of Hillsdale College
 Joseph L. Graves, Jr. (1977), Associate Dean for Research and Professor of Biological Studies 
 Matthew D. Green, (1999), Associate Professor of Computer Science at The Johns Hopkins University
 James Monroe Gregory (transferred to Howard University), Dean of Collegiate Department at Howard University
 Erwin Griswold (1925), lawyer, Solicitor General of the United States and dean of Harvard Law School
 Dennis Hale, 1966, Professor of Political Science, Boston College
 Walter Heller, 1935, economist and educator
 Robert Hutchins, educational philosopher, president (1929–1945) and chancellor (1945–1951) of the University of Chicago
 Lawrence R. Jacobs, American political scientist and founder and director of the Center for the Study of Politics and Governance at the University of Minnesota
 Dale Jacquette, 1975, analytic philosopher.
 Charlene Drew Jarvis, 1962, president of Southeastern University
 Robert Jervis (1962), International Relations professor
 Barbara Johnson (1969), literary critic, professor
 Amy Kelly, educator, historian, best-selling author
 Anne Osborn Krueger (1953), economist, World Bank Chief Economist (1982-1986)
 Edward O. Laumann (1960), George Herbert Mead Distinguished Service Professor of Sociology and the college; editor of the American Journal of Sociology (1978-1984, 1995–1997); Chair of the Department of Sociology at the University of Chicago; Dean of the Division of Social Sciences at the University of Chicago; Provost of the University of Chicago; director of the Ogburn Stouffer Center for Population and Social Organization at the University of Chicago
 Sarah Cowles Little (1838–1912), educator
 Susie Linfield, critic, editor, journalist, author and NYU professor
 Maud Mandel (1989), historian, Dean of the College of Brown University; 18th president, Williams College
 John Jay McKelvey, Sr. (1884), Attorney, Founder of Harvard Law Review
 Alan Wilfrid Cranbrook Menzies FRSE (1877–1966), Scottish-born professor, chemist who taught at Princeton University.
 Steven Mintz (1973) – Professor of History, University of Texas at Austin
Peter Molnar (1965), Professor of Geophysics, University of Colorado Boulder
 Roger Montgomery (1949), Dean of Architecture, City Planning, and Landscape Architecture, University of California, Berkeley
 Edward F. Mooney (1962), Professor of Religion, Syracuse University
 Anne Eugenia Felicia Morgan (1845–1909), professor, philosopher, writer, and game inventor
 L. L. Nunn, founder of Telluride Association and Deep Springs College
 Tom Novak (1977), Denit Trust Distinguished Scholar and Professor of Marketing, The George Washington University
 David Novak (1977), Professor of Ethnomusicology, University of California, Santa Barbara
 Daniel Orr (1954), professor, writer and chair of economics at University of Illinois at Urbana–Champaign
 Mary Jane Patterson (1862), educator and first African-American woman to receive a B.A (A.B.) degree
 Hugh V. Perkins (1941), author and former professor of education, Institute for Child Study, Department of Human Development, University of Maryland, College Park
 Laurence Perrine, author and professor 
 Paul Pierson (1981), professor of political science
 Willard V. O. Quine (1930), philosopher and logician
 Albert Rees, former University of Chicago and Princeton economics professor, former Provost at Princeton, advisor to President Gerald Ford
 Charles A. Reich (1949), legal and social scholar
Thomas L. Riis (1950), musicologist, specialist in American music
 William Sanders Scarborough (1875), classical scholar
 John E. Schwarz (1961), political scientist and author
 Robert E. Scott (1965), law professor
 Donald S. Strong (1912-1995), political scientist. 
 Kenneth Waltz (1948), political science professor
 Barbara Wertheimer (1946), historian and labor organizer
 Edwina Whitney (1894), librarian and educator
 C. Martin Wilbur (1931), historian, Sinologist
 Garnet C. Wilkinson (1902), educator and administrator
 Warren Wilson, namesake of Warren Wilson College in North Carolina
 Sheldon S. Wolin (1944), political theorist

Business
 Joani Blank (1959), founder of Good Vibrations
 Marc Canter (1980), co-founder of MacroMind (predecessor company of Macromedia)
 Jerry Greenfield (1973), co-founder of Ben & Jerry's ice cream
 John Gutfreund (1951), executive, former CEO of Salomon Brothers Inc.; Business Week named him "King of Wall Street" in the 1980s 
 Charles Martin Hall (1885), co-discoverer of the electrolytic process for producing aluminium; founder of Alcoa, Inc. (and contributor to the American spelling of "aluminum")
 Ralf Hotchkiss (1969), co-founder of Whirlwind Wheelchair International; 1989 MacArthur Foundation Fellow
 Kamal Quadir (1996), founder and CEO of bKash, which provides financial services to over 40 million customers
 David Shapira (1963), Executive Chairman Giant Eagle 
 Nova Spivack (1991), entrepreneur

Politics, government

Premiers
 H. H. Kung (1906), banker and Premier of the Republic of China (1938–39)

Legislators
 Blanche Bruce, second African-American Senator from Mississippi, serving 1874–1881
 Yvette Clarke (transferred from Medgar Evers College), Democratic representative for New York's 11th congressional district, 2007–present
 Jacob Dolson Cox, politician and author, governor of Ohio (1866–1888), US Secretary of the Interior (1869–1870)
 Paul Drennan Cravath (1882), lawyer, partner of Cravath, Swaine & Moore; creator of the "Cravath System"; founding Vice President of the Council on Foreign Relations
Richard A. Dawson, lawyer and state legislator in Arkansas
 Heather Deal (BA, 1983) City Councillor 2005–present, Vancouver City Council
 Ruth Hardy (BA, 1992) member, Vermont Senate
 John Langalibalele Dube, first (founding) President of the African National Congress
 Myron T. Herrick, 42nd Governor of Ohio
 Richard Hodges (1986), member of the Ohio House of Representatives, 1993–1999
 Hsiao Bi-khim (1993), Taiwan Representative to the United States; former member of the Legislative Yuan (Parliament) of Taiwan, representing the Democratic Progressive Party 
 Alfred A. Laun Jr., Wisconsin State Senator
 Jen Metzger (1987), New York State Senator, 2019–present
 Charles Mosher (1928) United States House of Representatives 1961-1977.
 Eduardo Mondlane (1953), Mozambican political leader
 Edward Schwartz (BA, 1965), at-large City Councilman 1984–87, Philadelphia City Council; first Councilman with a Pd.D (doctorate in political theory, Rutgers University); first Philadelphia Councilman to computerize his constituent services
 Delazon Smith, senator from Oregon. Smith was expelled from Oberlin.
 Harrison A. Williams (1941), U.S. senator and congressman from New Jersey

Mayors
 Stephanie Rawlings Blake (1992), former Mayor of Baltimore
 Adrian Fenty (1992), former Mayor of Washington, D.C.

Executive council
 Bruce Cole (1964), chairman of the National Endowment for the Humanities under George W. Bush
 Erwin Griswold (1925), solicitor general under presidents Johnson and Nixon
 Richard N. Haass (1973), president of the Council on Foreign Relations and former Director of Policy Planning for the U.S. Department of State
 Cynthia Hogan (1979), Counsel to the Vice President of the United States, Joe Biden, under President Obama
 Martha N. Johnson (1974), former official in the Clinton administration; Administrator of the United States General Services Administration
 Anne O. Krueger (1953), award-winning economist; deputy director of the International Monetary Fund; Oberlin trustee (1987–95)
 Robert Kuttner (1965), co-founder and co-editor of The American Prospect; one of five co-founders of the Economic Policy Institute
 Charles Sawyer (1908), Secretary of Commerce to Harry S. Truman

Diplomats
 John Mercer Langston (1849), U.S. Congressman representing Virginia's 4th Congressional District; US minister to Haiti under president Rutherford B. Hayes
 Edwin O. Reischauer (1931), U.S. Ambassador to Japan, 1961–1966
 Marcie Berman Ries (1972), U.S. ambassador to Bulgaria (October 1, 2012–present)
 Carl Rowan (1947), U.S. ambassador to Finland (1963); deputy assistant Secretary of State under President Kennedy; director of U.S. Information Agency under President Johnson
 John S. Service (1931), foreign service officer, China Hand
 Durham Stevens (1871), assassinated diplomat to Japan
 Tsiang Tingfu (1918), ambassador from Republic of China to Russia (1936–1938), United Nations (1947–1962), and USA (1962–1965)
 Hsiao Bi-Khim (1971), Taiwan Representative to the United States (July 20, 2020 – present); member of the Legislative Yuan (2002-2008 and 2012–2020)

Other
 Tom Balmer (1974), Chief Justice of the Oregon Supreme Court
 Alonzo Barnard (1843), Presbyterian missionary and abolitionist with his wife Sarah Philena Babcock Barnard (1843) 
Lee Fisher (1973), former Lieutenant Governor and former Attorney General of Ohio
 Erwin Griswold (1925), lawyer, Solicitor General of the United States and dean of Harvard Law School
Kan En Vong (1922), Chinese educator
Ruth A. Parmelee (1907), Christian missionary
Todd Portune (1980), former member of Cincinnati City Council (1993–2000); Hamilton County Commissioner (2001–2019)
 Albert Rees (1943), advisor to President Gerald Ford, former University of Chicago and Princeton economics professor, former Provost at Princeton
 Moses Fleetwood Walker, first African American major league baseball player
 Sylvia Williams (1957), former museum director for National Museum of African Art at Smithsonian Institution; pioneer in African art history

Activists
Nan Aron (1970), founder and president of Alliance for Justice
Josephine Penfield Cushman Bateham (1829-1901), social reformer, editor, writer
Kathleen Neal Cleaver (transferred to Barnard College), Senior Research Associate at Yale Law School known for her involvement in the Black Panther Party
Henry Roe Cloud, Native American political leader
Rennie Davis,  anti-Vietnam war activist and one of the Chicago Seven
Ernie Dickerman (1931), wilderness preservationist, focused in the eastern United States, The Wilderness Society (United States) staff from 1956 to 1976, Virginia Wilderness Committee president from 1976 to 1979, "Grandfather of Eastern Wilderness"
Matilda Evans (1891), first African American woman to practice medicine in South Carolina; community health advocate
Ida Gibbs (1884), educator, civil rights and women's suffrage advocate
John Mercer Langston (1849), early civil rights activist
James Lawson (Graduate School of Theology, 1950s), theoretician and tactician of nonviolence in US civil rights movement
Caroline F. Putnam (1848), abolitionist and educator 
Jerry Rubin,  anti-Vietnam war activist and one of the Chicago Seven
William F. Schulz (1971), former executive director of Amnesty International USA
Barbara Seaman (1956), principal member of the women's health feminism movement
Peter Staley (1983), AIDS activist, founding director of the Treatment Action Group
Lucy Stone (1847), feminist and abolitionist
Anna Louise Strong (1905), activist and author
Mary Church Terrell (1884/1888), author, activist
John Todd (1841), abolitionist, conspirator with John Brown, founder of Tabor College
Wayne Bidwell Wheeler (1894), attorney, prohibitionist
Mary Evans Wilson (ca. 1897), civil rights activist

Journalism

Broadcast media
Jad Abumrad, radio journalist, host and producer of Radiolab
Michael Barone (1968), host, Pipedreams
Alex Blumberg (1989), producer, This American Life
Chris Broussard (1990), Fox Sports sports analyst
Ben Calhoun (2001), radio journalist, producer for This American Life
Jon Hamilton (1983), NPR science correspondent
Aleks Krotoski, television and radio presenter ("Digital Human" on BBC Radio 4)
Robert Krulwich (1969), television and radio journalist (RadioLab on WNYC)
Roman Mars, radio producer and host, 99% Invisible on 91.7 KALW in San Francisco
Seth Rudetsky (1988), radio host, Broadway actor, pianist, writer
Alix Spiegel (1994), co-host of NPR's Invisibilia; producer for This American Life

Print and online
Peter Baker (1988), New York Times senior White House correspondent and author
John K. Byrne (2003) Founder of news website Raw Story
Wendell Dabney Influential civil rights activist
Michael Duffy (1980), writer, Washington Bureau Chief and editor of Time magazine
Kim France (1987), founding editor of Lucky magazine
Lisa Jervis (1993), creator and editor of Bitch magazine
 Fred Kaplan (1976), journalist and Slate columnist
James Kim (1992), senior CNET editor and technology analyst
Michelle Malkin (1992), writer (Los Angeles Daily News, The Seattle Times), author (In Defense of Internment), political commentator
James McBride (1979), journalist (Boston Globe, The Washington Post), author (The Color of Water), musician
Adam Moss (1979), editor of New York magazine
Emily Nussbaum (1988), television critic for The New Yorker magazine
Jane Pratt (1984), creator of Sassy and Jane magazines	
Tim Riley (1983), NPR critic; author (Tell Me Why, Lennon: Man, Myth, Music); Emerson College journalism professor (aka Tim Mikesell)
Carl T. Rowan (1947), journalist
David Schlesinger (1982) Editor-in-Chief, Reuters news, Thomson Reuters
Steve Silberman (1982), science writer for Wired
Sonia Shah (1990), investigative journalist
Sophia Yan (2009), reporter for Bloomberg News

Literature
Rumaan Alam, author of Leave The World Behind
Paolo Bacigalupi, author of The Windup Girl
Ishmael Beah (2004), author of A Long Way Gone: Memoirs of a Boy Soldier
Alison Bechdel (1981), cartoonist (Dykes To Watch Out For) and graphic novelist (Fun Home)
Bill Beverly (1987), novelist, author of Dodgers
Geoffrey Blodgett (1953), historian and author of Cass Gilbert: The Early Years
Wendy Brenner (1987), author of Phone Calls From the Dead
Alice Rowe Burks (1942), author of Who Invented the Computer?: The Legal Battle that Changed Computing History
Michael Byers (1991), novelist and author of The Coast of Good Intentions, Long for This World, and Percival's Planet
Gail Carriger (1998), fantasy novelist of Soulless
Tracy Chevalier (1984), novelist and author of Girl with a Pearl Earring, Falling Angels, and The Lady and the Unicorn
Anna J. Cooper (1884), author and teacher, fourth African-American woman to receive a PhD
Alev Lytle Croutier, Turkish-American author
Charles D'Ambrosio (1982), essayist, short story writer
Josh Emmons (1995), novelist (The Loss of Leon Meed, Prescription for a Superior Existence)
Jim Fixx (1957), columnist and editor (Saturday Review, McCalls, Life), author (The Complete Book of Running)
Darcy Frey (1983), non-fiction writer
Alan Furst (1962), novelist, author of Blood of Victory
Rosetta Luce Gilchrist (1870), physician, writer
Myla Goldberg (1993), novelist (Bee Season, Wickett's Remedy)
Harriett Ellen Grannis Arey (1819-1901), educator, author, editor, and publisher
Melissa Fay Greene (1975), author (There Is No Me Without You)
Linda Gregerson (1971), award-winning poet (Waterborne, Magnetic North)
David Halperin (1973), author (One Hundred Years of Homosexuality)
Bill Henderson (1965) author of Stark Raving Elvis, I Killed Hemingway, I, Elvis: Confessions of a Counterfeit King
Joe Hickerson (1957), American folklorist
Donovan Hohn (1972), author of Moby-Duck
Jonathan Holden (1963), poet (Knowing: New and Selected Poems)
Michael Hollinger (1984), playwright (Red Herring)
Cathy Park Hong (1998), poet (Translating Mo'um)
Tim Hurson (1967), speaker, writer, creativity theorist, author of Think Better: An Innovator's Guide to Productive Thinking
Myung Mi Kim (1979), poet 
Kiese Laymon (1997), professor and author of Long Division, How to Slowly Kill Yourself and Others in America, and Heavy, the 2019 Andrew Carnegie Medal for Excellence in Nonfiction
 Jason Little (1993), cartoonist and author of Shutterbug Follies and Motel Art Improvement Service
 Diane Louie (1975), poet and author of Fractal Shores, a 2019 winner of the National Poetry Series, and the 2021 John Pollard Foundation International Poetry Prize
David Maine (1985), novelist (The Preservationist)
Megan McDonald (1981), writer of children's literature (Judy Moody, The Great Pumpkin Switch)
J. Hillis Miller (1948), literary critic (The Ethics of Reading, On Literature)
Wayne Miller, poet 
Naeem Mohaiemen (1993), writer and artist whose projects research histories of the 1970s international left
Martha Moody (1977), author of Best Friends, Office of Desire, and Sometimes Mine
Thylias Moss (1981), poet, playwright, and 1996 MacArthur Fellow
Josh Neufeld (1989), cartoonist (A.D.: New Orleans After the Deluge, A Few Perfect Hours, The Influencing Machine)
Thisbe Nissen (1994), novelist (Out of the Girls' Room and Into the Night, Osprey Island)
Peggy Orenstein (1983), author (Cinderella Ate My Daughter: Dispatches from the Front Lines of the New Girlie-Girl Culture)
Rich Orloff (1973), playwright (Big Boys)
Dzvinia Orlowsky (1975), poet (Except for One Obscene Brush Stroke)
Jena Osman (1985), poet (The Character)
Suzanne Paola (1980), memoirist and poet (Lives of The Saints)
Lia Purpura (1986), poet (Stone Sky Lifting), essayist (Increase, On Looking)
David Rees (1994), cartoonist (My New Fighting Technique is Unstoppable, Get Your War On)
S. J. Rozan (1972), novelist (Reflecting the Sky), Edgar Allan Poe Mystery Award Winner, 2003
John C. Russell (1985), playwright (Stupid Kids)
Kathy Lou Schultz (1990), poet (Some Vague Wife)
Elizabeth Searle (1983), novelist (Celebrities in Disgrace)
Stephen W. Sears (1954), author (Gettysburg)
Vijay Seshadri (1974), poet (The Long Meadow)
Matthew Sharpe (1984), novelist (Nothing is Terrible, The Sleeping Father, Jamestown)
Gary Shteyngart (1995), novelist (The Russian Debutante's Handbook, Absurdistan, Super Sad True Love Story)
Donald J. Sobol (1948), author of the Encyclopedia Brown series
Matthew Stadler (1981), novelist (Allan Stein)
Jon Swan (1950), playwright, poet, librettist, and journalist
Marcia Talley (1965), novelist, Agatha and Anthony Award Winner, 2002, 2003, 2005
Michael Teig (1990), poet (Big Back Yard)
Joseph Jeffrey Walters (1893), author of Guanya Pau, the earliest surviving novel written in English by an African
Geoffrey Ward (1962), author (The West: An Illustrated History and The War: An Intimate History, 1941-1945)
Bruce Weigl (1973), poet (Archeology of the Circle: New and Selected Poems)
William Drake Westervelt (1871 and 1874; honorary degree 1926), Hawaiian historical writer
Christopher Robin "Kit" Woolsey (1964), writer (Matchpoints), bridge internationalist and backgammon expert
John Wray (1993), novelist (The Right Hand of Sleep, Lowboy)
Franz Wright (1977), poet, Pulitzer Prize winner (Walking to Martha's Vineyard)

Religion
William Ament, controversial missionary to China
Juanita Breckenridge Bates, Congregationalist minister, her application being the test case to determine the policy of the denomination; also first woman to be awarded a Bachelor of Divinity degree from Oberlin (1891)
Hobart Baumann Amstutz, bishop in The Methodist Church
Thanissaro Bhikkhu, abbot of a Buddhist monastery in California
Antoinette Brown (1847), first ordained female minister in the U.S.
John M. Brown Bishop of the AME Church
Lewis Sperry Chafer (1891), theologian; one of the prominent proponents of Christian Dispensationalism; founder and first president of Dallas Theological Seminary
Fanny Jackson Coppin (1865), influential educator and missionary
Marcus Dale, Early African-American preacher in New Orleans
Vernon Johns (1919), African-American preacher, widely hailed as the father of the civil rights movement
 William Weston Patton, African-American pastor, president of Howard University
Martha Root (1890s), Hand of the Cause in the Bahá'í Faith
Lorenzo Snow, fifth president and a prophet of the Church of Jesus Christ of Latter-day Saints
John Todd, founder of Tabor College (Iowa)
Henry Benjamin Whipple, Episcopal Bishop and advocate for the Native Americans, First Bishop of the Diocese of Minnesota

Science
See also: Nobel laureates
Arthur L. Benton (1931), neuropsychologist
Helen E. Blackwell (1994), organic chemist and chemical biologist, explorer of chemical signaling in bacteria
Mary Ann Bickerdyke, Civil War nurse and hospital administrator, post-war veteran advocate
Thaddeus Cahill (1889), physicist; inventor of the teleharmonium, the first electromechanical musical instrument
Patricia Charache, Microbiologist and infectious disease specialist
Kenneth Stewart Cole (1922), biophysicist, best known for creating the concept of the voltage clamp
Joan Feynman (1948), solar astrophysicist at JPL in Pasadena, California  Sister of Richard Feynman
Thomas Ebbesen (1966), physical chemist, pioneer in the field of nanoscience for which he received the Kavli Prize
Jim Fixx (1957), author of The Complete Book of Running
Thomas Frieden (1982), Director of the U.S. Centers for Disease Control and Prevention
Robert Galambos (1914–2010), researcher on bat echolocation
John Gofman (1939), scientist in the Manhattan Project; activist on issues with nuclear power and radiation danger
Elisha Gray, inventor of the telephone beaten to the patent office by Alexander Graham Bell; credited with invention of the electromechanical oscillator
 Matthew D. Green, (1999), co-inventor of ZCash, cryptocurrency.
Philip Hanawalt (1954), scientist, co-discoverer of DNA excision repair 
Robert Aimer Harper (1886), botanist, president of the Botanical Society of America
Edward Haskell (1929), scientist and educator
Ellen Hayes (1878) astronomer and mathematician
Donald Henderson (1928-2016), epidemiologist
Ralph F. Hirschmann (1922–2009), biochemist who led synthesis of the first enzyme.
James E. Humphreys, mathematician and LGBTQ activist
Ernest Ingersoll, naturalist
Richard Lenski (1977), biologist and 1996 MacArthur Fellow
John E. Mack (1951), psychologist, author (A Prince of Our Disorder)
Rollo May (1930), psychologist, author
Catherine McBride-Chang (1989), psychologist, researcher in cross-cultural development of early literacy skills
George Herbert Mead (1883), philosopher, leading figure of American pragmatism 
Ira Mellman (1973), cell biologist, discoverer of endosomes
John Wesley Powell (1858), geologist and explorer 
Anita Roberts (1964), molecular biologist who made pioneering observations of TGF beta 
Larry Squire (1963), Distinguished Professor of Neuroscience and Psychology at University of California, San Diego
Lynne Talley (1976), Professor of Physical Oceanography, Scripps Institution of Oceanography
Lauren V. Wood, allergist, immunologist, and Captain in the US Public Health Service
Paul Wennberg (1985), chemist and 2002 MacArthur Fellow
Felisa Wolfe-Simon, geomicrobiologist at the U.S. Geological Survey; Fellow of the NASA Astrobiology Institute

Visual and performing arts

Film and television
Kelly AuCoin (1989) actor (The Americans, Billions)
Sarah-Violet Bliss (2006), screenwriter and director (Search Party)
Eric Bogosian (1976), novelist, playwright (Talk Radio, subUrbia), and actor (Law and Order: Criminal Intent)
Avery Brooks (1970; honorary degree in 1996), actor in Uncle Tom's Cabin, American History X, Spenser: For Hire, best known as Benjamin Sisko in Star Trek: Deep Space Nine
Peter Buchman (1989), screenwriter for Jurassic Park III and Che
John Cazale (class of 1954, transferred to Boston University), actor in The Godfather (portrayed Fredo Corleone)  and The Deer Hunter
Will Chase (1992), Tony-Nominated theater and television actor, Dopesick, Sharp Objects, Nashville
Dr. Francois S. Clemmons (1968-1992) actor/singer best known as Officer Clemmons on Mister Rogers' Neighborhood
Lena Dunham (2008), actor, director, writer, best known for Tiny Furniture and the HBO series Girls
Su Friedrich (1975), experimental filmmaker
Nancy Giles (1981), actress in China Beach, commentator on CBS News Sunday Morning.
Ed Helms (1996), actor (The Office, The Hangover), comedian, correspondent on The Daily Show
Edward Everett Horton (1909; left his junior year; honorary degree 1953), actor (The Front Page, Top Hat, Holiday), voice actor (Rocky & Bullwinkle)
Maggie Keenan-Bolger (2006), actress and writer, wrote From the Inside, Out; co-founder of 4th Meal Productions; The Will Rogers Follies and The Music Man national tours
Judy Kuhn (1981), singer, Broadway performer, and singing voice of Disney's Pocahontas
Rex Lee (1990), actor, best known for his role on Entourage
Daniel London (1995), actor (Minority Report, Old Joy, Patch Adams)
Chris Morocco (2003), professional chef and YouTube personality
Jim Newman (1955), founder of Dilexi Gallery and Other Minds New Music Festival, San Francisco
Daniel Radosh (1991), journalist, blogger, writing staff of The Daily Show
Oren Rudavsky (1979), filmmaker (Hiding and Seeking, And Baby Makes Two, The Treatment)
Lynn Shelton, filmmaker
Ben Sinclair (2006), actor, writer, director, and producer (High Maintenance)Corey Stoll (1998), stage and screen actor (Intimate Apparel, Law & Order: LA, Midnight in Paris, House of Cards, Ant-Man)

Nick Wauters, television writer, creator of the NBC series The Event
Alexander Whybrow (2003), professional wrestler under the name Larry Sweeney

Stage theater
John Kander (1951), of the musical theater team Kander and Ebb (Cabaret, Chicago)
Romulus Linney (1953, honorary degree 1994), playwright
Albert Marre (1944), Tony Award-winning director and producer
Julie Atlas Muz, burlesque dancer, actress, stage director
Richard Tatum (1988), stage and voice actor; Associate Artistic Director of the ARK Theatre Company, Los Angeles
Mitch Weiss (1974), Broadway manager; (A Chorus Line, The Grapes of Wrath, Beauty & the Beast; Disney Theatricals, NY Shakespeare Festival)

Music
Benjamin Bagby (1974), vocalist, harpist, scholar, and founder of early music ensemble Sequentia
MaVynee Betsch, piano and voice
Rafiq Bhatia (2010), guitarist for Son Lux.
Chris Brokaw (1986), rock drummer for Codeine; guitarist for Come, Consonant
Alyson Cambridge (born 1980), operatic soprano and classical music, jazz, and American popular song singer
Brian Chase (2000), drummer for the Yeah Yeah Yeahs
Claire Chase, flautist
James David Christie, organist and pedagogue
John Austin Clark (2005), music director and harpsichordist
Dr. Francois S. Clemmons, (1980-2000) conductor, arranger, and founder/director of The Harlem Spiritual Ensemble
Stanley Cowell, jazz pianist
Theo Croker, jazz trumpeter, composer, arranger
David Daniels, conductor and author
Corey Dargel, composer and electronic musician
Dorothy DeLay, violinist
Jeremy Denk, pianist
R. Nathaniel Dett, conductor, pianist, composer, arranger
Allie Luse Dick (1859-1933), music teacher
Du Yun, Pulitzer Prize-winning composer, performance artist
Eighth Blackbird (all members), contemporary music sextet
Peter Evans, trumpeter
James Feddeck, Assistant Conductor of the Cleveland Orchestra; music director of the Cleveland Orchestra Youth Orchestra
John Ferguson, organist and composer
Sullivan Fortner, jazz pianist
Rhiannon Giddens (2000), founding member of the Carolina Chocolate Drops
Judith Gordon, pianist
Jason Myles Goss (2003), singer/songwriter
Denyce Graves, opera singer
John Gurney, opera singer
Al Haig, jazz pianist
 Megan Marie Hart (2006), opera singer
Dick Hensold (1981), folk musician, piper
Natalie Hinderas, professor, pianist and composer
Moses Hogan, conductor, composer, and arranger
Paul Horn (1952), jazz flautist
Matt Hubbard, Willie Nelson's producer; member of 7 Walkers
International Contemporary Ensemble, contemporary music ensemble
Amy Ippoliti, yoga teacher, chant and mantra recordings
Steven Isserlis (1980), British cellist, director of the International Musicians' Seminar
John Kander, composer of the musicals Chicago, Cabaret, and Curtains
John Kennedy, composer and conductor
Carla Kihlstedt, violinist, singer
Alex Klein, oboist
Jennifer Koh (1997), violinist, 1994 International Tchaikovsky Competition winner
Judy Kuhn, actress, singer
Scott Lawton, conductor
Sylvia Olden Lee, vocal coach and accompanist
Michael Maguire, actor/singer, best known for playing Enjolras in the original Broadway production of Les Misérables
David Maslanka, composer
James McBride, saxophonist, composer, author of New York Times best-seller The Color of Water
John McEntire (1991), drummer (Tortoise)
John T. "Jack" Melick, Jr., bandleader, pianist, and arranger
David Miller, tenor, member of the multi-platinum operatic pop quartet Il Divo
Jason Molina, singer-songwriter and guitarist
Amy X. Neuburg (1984), classical and pop singer
Farnell Newton, composer and jazz trumpeter
Karen O, singer, Yeah Yeah Yeahs
Milt Okun (1948), arranger, producer and musical director for popular 1960s singers such as Peter Paul and Mary, the Chad Mitchell Trio, and John Denver
Bob Ostertag, composer, performer, instrument builder, journalist, activist, historian
Doe Paoro (2006), singer-songwriter
James Paul, conductor
Alexander Perls (1998), songwriter, music producer
Liz Phair (1990), singer/songwriter
William Porter, organist and pedagogue
Nancy Priddy, singer-songwriter, back-up singer on Leonard Cohen's debut album
Derek Lee Ragin, countertenor
Josh Ritter (1999), singer/songwriter
Lucy Wainwright Roche (2003), musician, half-sister of Rufus Wainwright
Thomas Rosenkranz, pianist
Ned Rothenberg, woodwind multi-instrumentalist, composer
Christopher Rouse, Pulitzer Prize–winning composer
Michael Rudman (1960), award-winning theater director
Jonathan Sacks, orchestrator for films including Toy Story and Monsters, Inc.
Greg Saunier (1991), drummer for Deerhoof
Alex Scally (Guitarist)  Indie-Pop band Beach House
Jenny Scheinman, jazz violinist
Andrew Shapiro (1998), composer
Arlene Sierra, composer
Robert Sims
Robert Spano (1983), music director of the Atlanta Symphony Orchestra
William Grant Still, composer
Dick Sudhalter (1960), jazz musician and critic
Jon Theodore, drummer, The Mars Volta
Pyeng Threadgill, blues, soul blues and jazz singer (daughter of Henry Threadgill)
Jen Trynin (1986), rock singer/songwriter
Abdul Wadad, cellist
David Zinman, conductor

Visual arts
Cory Arcangel (2000), post-conceptual artist
 Aisha Cousins (2000), artist, performance art score writer/creator
Flora Crockett (1911), painter
Julia Vogl (2007), sculptor, public art

Notable faculty

Humanities

English and American Literature
 Pamela Alexander
 Kazim Ali
 Dan Chaon
 Martha Collins
 Angie Estes
 bell hooks
 Toni Morrison
 Heinz Politzer
 Eugene B. Redmond

French
John Kneller, English-American professor and fifth President of Brooklyn College

History
 Geoffrey Blodgett
 Jeffrey F. Hamburger, art historian
 James Hepokoski, music historian
 William Andrew Moffett
 Seymour Slive
 Robert Soucy
 Ronald G. Suny
 Laurence Thomas
 Amasa Walker
 Aaron Wildavsky

Philosophy
 Frank Ebersole
 John Millott Ellis
 Wilson Carey McWilliams
 Mike Michalson
 Ronald Grigor Suny

Religion
 Paula Richman

Visual art and performance
 Roger Copeland, Professor of Theater and Dance
 Pipo Nguyen-duy, Professor of Studio Art, Photography
 Sylvia Williams, Museum director, scholar of African art

Social science

Anthropology
 Ana Cara, scholar of Latin America
 Calvin C. Hernton
 Susan Kane, archaeologist and Professor of Art History
 Albert Howe Lybyer, scholar of the Middle East
 Gisela Richter, archaeologist
 W. I. Thomas
 John Milton Yinger

Economics
 Thomas Nixon Carver, professor 1894-1902
 James Monroe (1846), congressman from Ohio, professor 1883-1896

Sociology
 W. I. Thomas
 John Milton Yinger

Natural science

Mathematics
 Robert A. Bosch, author and recreational mathematician known for domino art and TSP art

Physics
 Mildred Allen
 Thaddeus Cahill, composer, physicist and inventor of the Telharmonium
 Elisha Gray, inventor of the electromechanical oscillator

Geology
 George Nelson Allen, first geologist to survey Yellowstone National Park
 Bruce Simonson, leading expert on banded iron formations

Environmental science
 David W. Orr

Zoology
 Hope Hibbard

Music

Composition
 Leslie Adams
 John Luther Adams
 George Nelson Allen
 Daniel Asia
 Conrad Cummings
 Đặng Thái Sơn
 Herbert Elwell
 Stephen Hartke
 Jonathan Kramer
 David Lang, composer and founder of Bang on a Can
 Tom Lopez
 David Maslanka
 Gary Lee Nelson
 Lewis Nielson
 Elizabeth Ogonek
 Curtis Roads
 Anna Rubin
 Igor Stravinsky, visiting composition professor, 1962-1963
 Gwyneth Van Anden Walker
 Olly Wilson
 John Williams, visiting composer, 1999-2000
 Joseph R. Wood

Performance
 Ryan Anthony, trumpeter with Canadian Brass
 David Boe, organ
 Stephen Clapp, violin
 Robin Eubanks, trombone
 Diana Gannett
 Stanislav Ioudenitch, piano
 Hugh Ragin, trumpet
 Peter Slowik, viola
 John Solum
 Robert Spano
 Alexa Still, flute
 Roland and Almita Vamos, viola
James Desano, trombone
Raymond Premru, trombone

Music theory
 Allen Cadwallader, theorist of Schenkerian analysis
 Jeffrey Mumford
 Willard Warch
 Andrew Pau, 6-time Jeopardy! champion

Voice
 Salvatore Champagne
 Marilyn Horne
 Richard Miller

Theology
 James Fairchild
 Charles Grandison Finney
 Asa Mahan

Administration
 William Dawes, trustee and fundraiser
 Mildred H. McAfee, Dean of Women
 Elizabeth Watson Russell Lord, Assistant Principal, Women's Department (1884–94); Assistant Dean, Women's Department (1894-1900)

Presidents
 Asa Mahan, 1835–50 
 Charles Grandison Finney, leader in the Second Great Awakening, president 1851–66
 James Fairchild, 1866–89
 William Gay Ballantine, 1891–96
 John Henry Barrows, 1899–1902
 Henry Churchill King, 1902–27
 Ernest H. Wilkins, 1927–46
 William Stevenson, 1946–60
 Robert K. Carr, 1960–69
 Robert W. Fuller, 1970–74
 Emil Danenberg, 1975–82
 S. Frederick Starr, 1983–94 
 Nancy Dye, 1994–2007
 Marvin Krislov, 2007–2017
 Carmen Twillie Ambar, 2017–present

Athletics
 C. K. Fauver
 Edgar Fauver
 Edward Fauver
 Moses Fleetwood Walker, first African-American major league baseball player
 John Heisman, football coach in 1892 and 1894
 T. Nelson Metcalf
 Tommie Smith, 1968 Mexico City Olympics gold medal winner and anti-racism activist, track coach and sociology faculty, 1972–78

References

 
Oberlin College people